The 2015 Little League Softball World Series was held in Portland, Oregon from August 13 to August 19, 2015.  Six teams from the United States and four from throughout the world competed for the Little League Softball World Champions.

Teams

Each team that competes in the tournament will come out of one of the 10 regions.

Results

All times US PST.

Elimination round

References

Little League Softball World Series
2015 in softball
2015 in sports in Oregon
Softball in Oregon